The Lockheed Martin Polecat (company designation P-175) was an unmanned aerial vehicle by Lockheed Martin. It was developed by the company's Advanced Development Programs division in Palmdale, California.

Design and development
Designated P-175, the Polecat was funded internally by Lockheed Martin (as opposed to using United States Government funds) at the beginning of 2005. The prototype was unveiled at the 2006 Farnborough Airshow. It was developed over a period of 18 months.

On December 18, 2006, the aircraft crashed due to an "irreversible unintentional failure in the flight termination ground equipment, which caused the aircraft's automatic fail-safe flight termination mode to activate."

Specifications

References

Polecat
2000s United States experimental aircraft
Unmanned military aircraft of the United States
Twinjets
Flying wings
Unmanned stealth aircraft